The Castle of Zorita de los Canes-Alcazaba de Zorita (Spanish: Castillo de Zorita de los Canes-Alcazaba de Zorita) is a castle located in Zorita de los Canes, Spain. It was declared Bien de Interés Cultural in 1931.

References 

Bien de Interés Cultural landmarks in the Province of Guadalajara
Castles in Castilla–La Mancha